UK Border Force is a documentary series that focused on the work of the border agency of the United Kingdom, and revealed the action behind the scenes of immigration to the country.

The series follows officers at London Heathrow Airport and the ports of Dover and Calais. The series also follows enforcement teams operating within the UK to detect illegal workers and highlights the work of entry clearance officers at British Missions overseas.

See also
 UK Immigration Service
 Nothing to Declare UK

References

2008 British television series debuts
2009 British television series endings
2000s British documentary television series
Sky UK original programming
United Kingdom border control
English-language television shows
Television series about border control